The Vortex Tour was a worldwide tour by American R&B/soul singer Erykah Badu in support of her Platinum selling 2008 album, New Amerykah Part One (4th World War). The U.S. tour kicked off May 4, in Detroit, MI ending on June 15, in Albuquerque, N.M. The second leg of tour reached Europe on June 25, in Copenhagen, Denmark. Badu toured across Europe playing shows that included an itinerary for the month of July. Several more shows were added throughout August in the U.S.

Opening act
The Roots (USA—Leg 1)

Setlist
"My People/Intro" (Instrumental)
"Amerykahn Promise"
"The Healer"
"Me"
"My People"
"Twinkle"
"The Cell"1
"Back in the Day" (contain elements of "Juicy Fruit)"
"On & On"/"...& On"
"Didn't Cha Know?"
"Soldier"
"Master Teacher"
"Appletree" (Remix)
"I Want You" (contain elements of "Love To Love You Baby")
"Next Lifetime"1
"Annie" 1
"Other Side of the Game"
"Danger"
"Time’s a Wastin’"
"Orange Moon"
Medley: "Liberation"/ "Green Eyes"1
"Love of My Life (An Ode to Hip-Hop)"
"Telephone"2
"Tyrone"
"Honey"1
"Bag Lady"

1 performed on select dates in North America and Europe2 performed on select dates in North America.

Additional notes
On select dates, as Badu performed "Other Side of the Game", members of The Roots would strut and dance across the stage as she adlib, "can't understand the game".
During select dates in Europe, "The Cell" was performed followed by "Twinkle", Badu sang the chorus of Common's "The Light" after "Bag Lady".

Band
Director/Keyboards: R.C. Williams
Guitar: Michael Feingold
Percussions: James Clemons
Bass: Stepen Bruner
Drums: Lamont Taylor
Flute: Dwayne Kerr
Turntables: Rashad Smith
Background vocals: Keisha Jackson, Koryan "Nayrok" Wright, Rachel Yahvah

Tour dates

References

External links
 erykah-badu.com
 Ladakh Tour
 http://www.hivino.travel
 https://tuscanyuntouchedtours.com/

Erykah Badu concert tours
2008 concert tours